George H. Ray (October 4, 1847October 31, 1910) was a Canadian American immigrant, businessman, and Republican politician.  He was the 40th speaker of the Wisconsin State Assembly, and represented the city of La Crosse in the Assembly for five terms.  He was also chairman of the La Crosse County board of supervisors.

Biography
Ray was born on October 4, 1847, in St. Stephen, New Brunswick. He died on October 31, 1910.

Career
Ray was first elected to the Assembly in 1894. He served as Speaker during the 1899 and 1901 sessions. Previously, he had been a member of the Gardiner, Maine, City Council. Additionally, Ray was a member of the La Crosse County, Wisconsin, serving as Chairman for two years. He was a Republican.

References

1847 births
1910 deaths
People from St. Stephen, New Brunswick
People from Gardiner, Maine
Politicians from La Crosse, Wisconsin
Republican Party members of the Wisconsin State Assembly
Maine city council members
Maine Republicans
American bank presidents
19th-century American politicians